Soccer (May 17, 1988 – June 26, 2001) was a Jack Russell Terrier and animal actor. A veteran of many television commercials for such companies like Nike Athletics and Mighty Dog Dog Food, he became famous portraying the talking dog Wishbone in the PBS Kids television series of the same name. Chosen from more than 100 dogs who auditioned for the role, Soccer appeared in almost every episode of the show during its 1995–1998 run. He lived with his trainer, Jackie Martin Kaptan, on the Plano, Texas, ranch where the Wishbone series was filmed and was buried there after his 2001 death. Soccer, as Wishbone, was considered by many to be one of the most beloved TV dogs of the 1990s. His sire Blencathra Badger was the first winner of the Parson Russell Terrier best of breed prize at Crufts in 1990.

Filmography
Wishbone (1995–1997)
Wishbone's Dog Days of the West (1998)

See also
 List of individual dogs

References

External links
 
 Wishbone on DVD
 World Wide Wishbone – Inactive

1988 animal births
2001 animal deaths
Dog actors